The Mohrman-Jack-Evans House is an historic building located at 342 Columbus Avenue in Lebanon, Warren County, Ohio. Built in 1850 in the Greek Revival and Italianate styles of architecture, it was originally a single-family house. On October 10, 1984, when it was added to the National Register of Historic Places, it was serving as the meeting place of First Church of Christ, Scientist. Today, it is the office of an insurance agency. First Church of Christ, Scientist, Lebanon is now Christian Science Society and meets at 109 West Mulberry Street in Lebanon.

References

Houses on the National Register of Historic Places in Ohio
Italianate architecture in Ohio
Houses completed in 1850
Houses in Warren County, Ohio
National Register of Historic Places in Warren County, Ohio
Former Christian Science churches, societies and buildings in Ohio